Drypetes sepiaria is a species of small tree in the family Putranjivaceae. This tree is very common in India and Sri Lanka. It is known by many local names, including vellakasavu, veeramaram in Malayalam, vellilambu, veerai (வீரை), aadumilukkan, kaayalakkamaram in Tamil, and weera (වීර) in Sinhala.

Description

The inflorescence flowers are bracteolate, axillary clusters or short racemes. The fruits are crimson in color, small sphere in shape and fusiform drupe. The mature leaves are broadly oval-oblong and base cordate to rounded in shape and glossy on the upper side. The young leaves are light green in color, turning dark green as they mature. The trunk are often gnarled, twisted or flutes, rigid, much-branched and puberulous.

It grows in monsoon forest and scrub lands.

Uses
The tree has edible tropical fruit. Its trunk uses in fence and other mature branch and fence use as firewood.

References

External links

 Drypetes sepiaria (Wight & Arn.) Pax & K. Hoffm

sepiaria
Flora of India (region)
Trees of Sri Lanka